Cargolux Italia S.p.A. is an Italian cargo airline, set up as a joint venture between various Italian investors and Cargolux. Its head office is located at Vizzola Ticino and its hub is Milan-Malpensa Airport. The airline was established in December 2008 and commenced operations in June 2009.

Destinations 

Cargolux Italia serves the following destinations with scheduled cargo flights:

Fleet 

As of January 2023, the Cargolux Italia fleet consists of the following aircraft:

References

External links
Official website

Airlines of Italy
Association of European Airlines members
Cargo airlines of Italy
Companies based in Milan
Airlines established in 2008
Italian companies established in 2008
2008 establishments in Italy